Sivens Dam (Barrage de Sivens) was a dam which was planned for construction across the Tescou, a tributary of the Tarn in the basin of the Garonne in Southern France, near to Toulouse. The construction site was 10 km north of Lisle-sur-Tarn, in the Department of Tarn (Midi-Pyrénées). The dam was named after the nearby Forest of Sivens. Construction work began in 2014 and was then halted after Rémi Fraisse, a 21-year-old man protesting against the construction project, was killed by a stun grenade fired by police. His death sparked further protests across France, some of which were violent. The project was then closed in 2015 by the Minister of Ecology Ségolène Royal. There was a later proposal for a smaller dam.

Original plan
Sivens is in the Tescou, a tributary of the Tarn in the basin of the Garonne. A barrage project was initiated for the formation of a water reservoir with a volume of 1.5 million cubic metres used especially for irrigation of agricultural land and the control of the low water Tescou. The impact of the project lies in retaining the flooding of 12 hectares of wetland. Countervailing measures were planned to restore a total area of 19.5 hectares of wetlands. This project was to have benefited from 30%  European funds (Fedear). The main actors of the project were the general council of Tarn region, Water Agency Adour Garonne and the development company "Slopes of Gascony".

Protests
In 2011, a collective called Tant qu’il y aura des bouilles was created to fight this project. The name means 'As long as there are bouilles,' with bouilles in local dialect meaning a swampy piece of land that is not worth very much money. Hundreds of people came to protect the biodiversity of the wetlands and to prevent the construction of the dam. They created a ZAD (French: zone à défendre) or 'Zone to Defend' in 2013, as a permanent protest camp called ZAD du Testet. It was evicted twice (in February and May 2014) and both times resquatted again. The summer and autumn of 2014 saw many battles between police and demonstrators, as the construction works began.

A policeman was charged in 2018 with a crime punishable by up to 5 years in prison and a fine of 75,000 euros ('violences volontaires') for throwing a grenade into a caravan where three people were sheltering. At first the policeman claimed he threw the grenade at more demonstrators coming as reinforcements but this was not true. He then claimed he had not intended to throw the grenade into the caravan but this was also disproved by the evidence. This event occurred on 7 October 2014, three weeks before the death of Rémi Fraisse. The policeman was convicted in January 2019. He was given a suspended sentence of 6 months, during which time he was forbidden to use a weapon, and he was fined 1,000 euros to be paid to the woman he injured.

Death of Rémi Fraisse
Rémi Fraisse, a 21 year-old botanist, was killed instantly by a police stun grenade fired in the early hours of Sunday morning, 26 October 2014. It was the first death at a protest on mainland France since 1986. Shortly afterwards the regional council decided to halt work on the project. In January 2015, Ségolène Royal announced that the project was cancelled.

Smaller dam
In March 2015, the departmental council of Tarn voted narrowly in favour of building a dam and creating a reservoir further upstream around half the size of the original project. They also requested that the police cleared the ZAD.

See also
 Demonstration of October 25 and 26, 2014 against the Sivens dam. :fr: Manifestation des 25 et 26 octobre 2014 contre le barrage de Sivens

References

External links
Collectif pour la sauvegarde de la zone humide du TESTET (Collective for the safeguarding of the Testet Wetlands)
Tant qu'il y aura des bouilles

Autonomism
Cancelled dams
Dams in France
Dam controversies
Squats in France